Josyane de Jesus Bergey (born 1941) is a Franco/Portuguese poet.

Biography
Josyane de Jesus Bergey was born in La Rochelle, France in 1941.
Retired from the civil services, she is the vice president of a French literary association, registered in La Rochelle under the name "Larochellivre". In this role, she organises literary meetings in the Charente Maritime as well as events such as "The Poets' Spring Time" and the "Salon of Poetry Works" in La Rochelle.
Josyane de Jesus Bergey is a close friend of Jean Bouhier who founded the poetic movement of the school of Rochefort "l'Ecole de Rochefort” with Pierre Pernon in 1941 and, in 1991, she was the initiator of the foundation at Vesdun (Cher) of the "Forest of one thousand Poets" where the poets of 85 nations are represented by an oak tree. Each tree being dedicated to a creator of a commemorative site of this school where Jean Bouhier can be found amongst others.

Influenced by the culture of Mediterranean peoples, several poems of De Jesus Bergey are dedicated to the Arab nations such as the Palestinian Mahmoud Darwish and the Algerian Mohamed Dib.
Other texts are translated into English by Angela Serna, and in Portuguese by Ruth Motta.

Participation at meetings and festivals
 2005: 'Mediterranean Voices', a poetic festival at Lodeve
 2006: 'Poets' Springtime' at Lodeve
 May 2008: 'Vitoria-Gasteitz' (Spain)
 June 2008: 'Poetry Festival Through Tunisia' (poetry, painting and translation) organised by the National Centre of Translation (Tunis University).

Selected bibliography
 L'heure Marine / Sea Time, editions' Petit Véhicule, 1995
 Pour un soleil qui meurt / For a Dying Sun, editions' Arcam 1996
 De l’arbre à l’homme... jusqu’à l’épuisement de la saignée / From the tree to the man... till the end of the bleeding, La Bartavelle Editeur, 1997
 La brodeuse d´écume / The Foam Embroidery, editions' Clapas 1998
 L’eau Perride / The Lost Lake, La Bartavelle Editeur, 1998
 Le temps suspensif / The Suspensive Time, editions' Encres vives 1998
 Un cheval sur l’océan / A horse on the ocean", editions' Encres vives 1999
 Ne me raccompagnez pas, je suis pressée / Do not accompany me back, I am in a hurry, La Bartavelle Editeur, 2000
 Comme une confession de pierres - Eldjazaïr / Like a Stone Confession – Eldjazaïr, editions' Rumeur des Ages, La Rochelle 2003, bilingual edition French-Arab (translations by the Tunisian poet Mohamed Rafrafi).
 Ce n’est pas parce que la porte s’est refermée / The door closed on itself, editions' Rumeur des Ages, La Rochelle 2003
 Amulettes / «Amulets», edition "Encre et Lumière", March 2009 / publication of «Amulettes», with paintings by Hamid Tibouchi.

Narration
 BUS 25 pour rendre visite aux ombres / "BUS 25 to call on the shadows", Rumeur des Ages, mars 2004

Prose works
 La Grande Boiterie / The Big Lameness, Rumeur des Ages 2005

Portfolio
 Voiles 2008 / "Sails 2008", Work with the painter Marc Mongeau from Quebec.

She had a share in different expositions and demonstrations of poetry & paintings:

 2006 with Joëlle Vassogne (La Rochelle)
 2006 with the painter and poet Hamid Tibouchi in Frontignan(34)
 2007 Mohamed Oulhaci (Algeria)
 2008 Marc Mongeau (La Grande Traversée / The great Crossing, La Rochelle/Quebec June 2008
 2009 ANA SANCUEZ SERRANO (Vitoria - Spain)

Publications in different poetry anthologies
 Quebec 2008, Co editor Ecrits des Forges (Québec) and "Sac à Mots" editions (France) collective poetry book with twenty contributing authors from two continents. De Jesus-Bergey is the initiator with Larochellivre of this book.

In French and foreign revues
 2008 “Le Poème Henri Meschonnic”, Faire Part editions with about forty five other contributors.

Translation
 Poetic co-revision, with Mohamed Rafrafi, of the translation done by Hédia DRIDI from Arabic into French for the poems collection of the Iraqi poet Wafaa Abed Al Razzaq, entitled "From The War Child's Dairy" (Mémoires de l'enfant de la guerre) L'Harmattan Edition, December 2008

References

1941 births
Living people
French poets
French women poets